Ulla Lock (19 April 1934 – 20 September 2012) was a Danish film actress. She appeared in 19 films between 1953 and 1978. She was born in Copenhagen.

Filmography

 Slægten (1978)
 Man sku være noget ved musikken (1972)
 Tjærehandleren (1971)
 Erotik (1971)
 De usynlige (1970)
 Farvel Thomas (1968)
 Billet til månen (1967)
 Tegneserie (1967)
 Vi voksne (1963)
 Lykkens musikanter (1962)
 Baronessen fra benzintanken (1960)
 Kvindelist og kærlighed (1960)
 Jomfruburet (1959)
 Onkel Bill fra New York (1959)
 Tre piger fra Jylland (1957)
 Der var engang en gade (1957)
 Den kloge mand (1956)
 Det er så yndigt at følges ad (1954)
 Min søn Peter (1953)

References

External links

1934 births
2012 deaths
Danish film actresses
Actresses from Copenhagen
20th-century Danish actresses